The 10th Platino Awards, presented by the Entidad de Gestión de Derechos de los Productores Audiovisuales (EGEDA) and the Federación Iberoamericana de Productores Cinematográficos y Audiovisuales (FIPCA), will take place on 22 April 2023 at IFEMA Palacio Municipal in Madrid, Spain, to recognize the best in Ibero-American film and television of 2022. The ceremony will be hosted by actors Carolina Gaitán, Omar Chaparro and Paz Vega, and will be broadcast by TNT to Latin America.

Background
The location and date of the ceremony was announced on September 2022 with the host city being Madrid for the fifth time in the history of the awards, it is also the third consecutive time that the ceremony will take place at IFEMA Palacio Municipal. In February 2023, the pre-selection of films and series was announced. Regarding the film categories, 13% of the pre-selections were from Spain, being the most represented country followed by Argentina (9%), Chile (7%), Mexico (7%), Brasil (6%) and Colombia (6%). In regard of the television area, Mexico has the most pre-selections with 23, followed by Colombia (22), Argentina (20), Spain (19) and Chile (16). It was also announced the introduction of a new category named Best Comedy Film. Later in the month, the longlists were announced with 20 films or series in each category.

The nominations were announced on 9 March 2023 with Argentine film Argentina, 1985 receiving a record-breaking fourteen nominations, followed by The Beasts, Lullaby and Bardo, False Chronicle of a Handful of Truths, all three with six nominations. Puerto Rican actor Benicio del Toro is set to receive the Platino Honorary Award.

Winners and nominees
The nominees are listed as follows:

Film

Films with multiple nominations
The following films received multiple nominations:

Television

Series with multiple nominations
The following series received multiple nominations:

Platino Honorary Award
 Benicio del Toro

References

External links
 

Platino
Platino
Platino
Platino